This is a list of German television related events from 1980.

Events
20 March - Katja Ebstein is selected to represent Germany at the 1980 Eurovision Song Contest with her song "Theater". She is selected to be the twenty-fifth German Eurovision entry during Ein Lied für Den Haag held at the BR Studios in Munich.

Debuts

ARD
 1 January – Die rote Zora und ihre Bande (1980)
 22 January – Die Leute vom Domplatz (1980)
 18 March – Jan vom anderen Stern (1980)
 23 April – Krelling (1980)
 4 June – Lucilla (1980)
 12 June – Scheibenwischer  (1980–2008)
 September – Harry Hocker läßt nicht locker  (1980–1981)
3  September – Im schönsten Bilsengrunde (1980)
1  September – Achtung Zoll! (1980–1981)
 2 October – Café Wernicke (1980–1981)
 5 October – Familie Meier (1980)
 6 October – Liebe ist doof (1980–1981)
 12 October – Lucy the Menace of Street (1980)
 12 October – Berlin Alexanderplatz (1980)
 14 October – Susi (1980)
 28 October –  Auf Achse  (1980–1996)
 3 December – ... und die Tuba bläst der Huber (1980–1983)
 25 December – Die Reventlow (1980)

ZDF
 4 January –  Felix und Oskar (1980)
 8 January – Ein Park für alle (1980)
 12 January – Merlin (1980)
 3 February – Leute wie du und ich  (1980–1984)
 28 February –  Un-Ruhestand - Geschichten vom Älterwerden (1980)
 4 March –  Anderland (1980–1986)
 8 March –  So geht's auch (1980)
 18 September – Kreuzfahrten eines Globetrotters (1980–1981)
 25 December –  Ringstraßenpalais (1980–1986)

DFF
 4 January –  Archiv des Todes (1980)
 22 August – Die Fischers und ihre Frauen (1980)
 23 November – Das Mädchen Störtebeker (1980)

International
15 November – // The Moomins (1977–1982) (ORF)

Television shows

1950s
Tagesschau (1952–present)

1960s
 heute (1963-present)

1970s
heute-journal (1978-present)
Tagesthemen (1978-present)

Ending this year

Births

Deaths